KM Arau is an offshore patrol vessel (OPV) operated by the Malaysian Coast Guard. KM Arau was formerly known as Oki (PL-01) in the Japan Coast Guard.

Overview
The ship is crewed by a contingent of 54. KM Arau has a helicopter deck to operate one medium-sized helicopter.

References 

Patrol vessels of Malaysia